Two different crucifixes, or strictly, wooden corpus figures for crucifixes, are attributed to the High Renaissance  master Michelangelo, although neither is universally accepted as his.  Both are relatively small figures which would have been produced in Michelangelo's youth.

Santo Spirito figure
One is a polychrome wood sculpture possibly finished in 1492 which had been lost from view by scholars until it re-emerged in 1962; in 2001 new investigations appeared to confirm the attribution to Michelangelo. It was perhaps made for the high altar of the Church of Santo Spirito di Firenze in Florence, Italy. The work is especially notable for the fact that this Christ is naked.

History 
Michelangelo Buonarroti was a guest of the convent of Santa Maria del Santo Spirito (Florence) when he was seventeen years old, after the death of his protector Lorenzo de' Medici. Here he could make anatomical studies of the corpses coming from the convent's hospital; in exchange, he is said to have sculpted the wooden crucifix which was placed over the high altar. Today the crucifix is in the octagonal sacristy of the Basilica of Santa Maria del Santo Spirito.

Description 
The nudity of the figure is true to the Gospels. All of the Gospel writers suggest the nakedness, while John supplies the details:

The sign attached to the cross includes Jesus' accusation inscribed in Hebrew, Greek and Latin. The wording translates "Jesus of Nazareth King of the Jews".  All of the evangelists record this inscription, which varies slightly among them.  Here the artist favored the rendering from John's Gospel.

Also present is the spear wound inflicted into Jesus' side by a Roman soldier.  His blood is seen here dripping from the wound on his right side.

Other crucifix attributed to Michelangelo 

In December 2008, the Italian government acquired from the antique dealer Giancarlo Gallino for €3.2 million another polychrome corpus for a crucifix in limewood; this is less than half the size of the Santo Spirito figure.  The figure had been previously exhibited in 2004 in the Museo Horne in Florence.

Some art historians attributed the work to Michelangelo based only on stylistic criteria, as the sculpture is not documented by contemporary biographers of Michelangelo Ascanio Condivi and Giorgio Vasari. The figure measures  and was allegedly made around 1495. In December 2009, an inquiry has been opened into the acquisition of the crucifix by the Italian state. ANSA reports that: "several experts have cast doubts on the attribution, with the doyenne of Michelangelo cross studies, German art historian Margrit Lisner, saying it was probably a Sansovino."

There have been academic debates regarding the authenticity of the two crosses already attributed to Michelangelo. In a book published by the Leipzig University Press in 2019, the Milanese restaurator and art historian Antonio Forcellino takes a position in the discussion about Michelangelos crucifix of Santo Spirito. There he identifies Michelangelo's crucifix of Santo Spirito as a wooden crucifix that is still privately owned. Antonio Forcellino attributes this work to Michelangelo not only because of its display of anatomical detail but mainly due to an epigraph, which was inscribed on the back of the work at the beginning of the 18th century.

See also
List of statues of Jesus
List of works by Michelangelo

Notes

References

External links

Sculptures by Michelangelo
Michelangelo
1492 sculptures
Sculptures in Florence
Wooden sculptures
Nude sculptures